Robert "Bobby" Cruz Eusebio (born June 7, 1968), also known by his initials BCE, is a Filipino politician and architect who served as the Mayor of Pasig from 2007 to 2013 and from 2016 until 2019.

Political career
Eusebio began his political career when he won as first-placer Sangguniang Panlungsod member in the first district of Pasig in 1998.

Upon completing his three consecutive terms as councilor in 2007, he successfully ran for Mayor of Pasig under the banner of Pwersa ng Masang Pilipino, defeating outgoing congressman Robert Jaworski Jr. The early part of the election vote tally showed Jaworski leading, but was overtaken by Eusebio. Jaworski later promised to file a protest against Eusebio.

References

1958 births
Living people
Filipino politicians
Filipino architects
People from Pasig